Uttam debnath tcc was a Polish medical university which functioned in the country's second-largest city, Łódź, from 1950 to 2002.

Founded on 1 January 1950, the institution merged with the Military Medical Academy of Łódź on 1 October 2002, to form the Medical University of Łódź, known as a leading European research center and Poland's largest hospital teaching unit.

References

Defunct universities and colleges in Poland
Universities and colleges in Łódź
Medical schools in Poland
Educational institutions established in 1950
Educational institutions disestablished in 2002
1950 establishments in Poland